Sinocyclocheilus guanyangensis is a species of freshwater ray-finned fish from the family Cyprinidae. It is endemic to the Li-Jiang Basin in Guanyang County in Guanxi. It has vestigial eyes, a conical snout and lacks a hump at the back of the head.

References

Fish described in 2016
Freshwater fish of China
Sinocyclocheilus